The Premier Basketball League (formerly: Kompetisi Bola Basket Utama or Kobatama), in Indonesian: Liga Bola Basket Utama, often abbreviated to the PBL, is the pre-eminent semi-professional men's basketball league in Indonesia, competed by 8 clubs across the country. It is organised by Board of PBL Indonesia and sanctioned by Perbasi (Indonesia Basketball Association).

The competition started as Kobatama in 1982. In 2010, Perbasi as the owner of this competition was no longer afford the highest amateur league. Driven by the spirit of togetherness to not suffer the same fate with KOBANITA, the KOBATAMA Council with 8 clubs participants 2009 KOBATAMA and the winner inter-club competitions 2009 National Basketball Championship Division I are determined to keep playing 2010/2011 season by forming a league to fill the void KOBATAMA named Premier Basketball League which is abbreviated PBL sanctioned by Perbasi, through decisions PERBASI Number 287/PB/XI year 2010 dated November 1, 2010 On Implementation of Appointment Letters Premier Basketball League. PBL 2010/2011 organized by the collective cost of 10 club participants, the competition uses a system of full competition two rounds with four compositions qualifying series, and the final four.

Current clubs 
In the Premier Basketball League (PBL) third season that will unfold in the year 2013, the number of PBL team will certainly doubled, four new teams would have to make sure yourself participates.

 PIM NAD (Aceh)
 Champ Bandung
 Cendrawasih Papua
 Banyuasin (South Sumatra)
 Scorpio Jakarta  (new)
 Gelora Bahari Tegal (new)

List of Champions

KOBATAMA Champions 
Below is a list KOBATAMA champions from the first edition in 1982 to the last edition in 2002.

PBL Champions

Number of championships won by clubs 
Excluding KOBATAMA era.

List of MVP's

References 

 
Indonesia